Ordaklu (also Romanized as Ordaklū; also known as Erdaglyu) is a village in Bonab Rural District of the Central District of Marand County, East Azerbaijan province, Iran. At the 2006 National Census, its population was 3,892 in 986 households. The following census in 2011 counted 5,133 people in 1,485 households. The latest census in 2016 showed a population of 5,985 people in 1,717 households; it was the largest village in its rural district.

References 

Marand County

Populated places in East Azerbaijan Province

Populated places in Marand County